Ismaila Usman was the Finance Minister of Nigeria from 1998 - 1999.
He was suspended by General Sani Abacha as the deputy governor of the Central Bank of Nigeria, but was appointed by Abdulsalami Abubakar to oversee the federal ministry of Finance.

References

Year of birth missing (living people)
Living people
Nigerian Muslims
Finance ministers of Nigeria